Coppa Titano 2008–09 was the forty-ninth season of San Marino's oldest football competition. It began on 2 October 2008 with the first games of the Group Stage and ended on 4 May 2009 with the Final held at Stadio Olimpico, Serravalle. Murata were the defending champions. The winners of the competition earned a place in the second qualifying round of the UEFA Europa League 2009–10.

Competition format
The competition consisted of two stages, the Group Stage and the Elimination Rounds. The Group Stage consisted of three groups with five teams each. Every team played two games (once home and once away) against every other team of its group. The top two teams from each group, as well as the two best third-placed teams, qualified for the Elimination Rounds. The Elimination Rounds were a single-game elimination tournament. Games in the Elimination Rounds were decided by extra time and, if necessary, a penalty shootout.

Group stage

Group A

Group B

Group C

Deciding match
Because Murata and La Fiorita had the same number of points and identical goal difference, they played a deciding match in order to determine the second quarterfinal participant from Group A. The match was played on April 22, 2009, at Stadio Olimpico, Serravalle.

Elimination rounds

Quarterfinals
The matches were played on 27 April 2009.

Semifinals
The matches were played on 30 April 2009.

Final
The match was played on 4 May 2009 at Stadio Olimpico, Serravalle.

References

External links
 Official website 

Coppa Titano seasons
San Marino
Coppa